Shoulderbone is an unincorporated community in Hancock County, in the U.S. state of Georgia.

History
A variant name was "Shoulder". The community was named for its location on Shoulderbone Creek.

References

Unincorporated communities in Hancock County, Georgia
Unincorporated communities in Georgia (U.S. state)